France 3 Rhône-Alpes Auvergne is one of France 3's regional services broadcasting to people in the Auvergne-Rhône-Alpes region. It was founded in 1954 as RTF Télé-Lyon. The service is headquartered in Lyon, the capital of the region. Programming is also produced by France 3 Rhône-Alpes.The service can also be seen in Switzerland.

Presenters
 Sébastien Naissant
 Jean-Christophe Solari
 Alain Fauritte

Programming
 19/20 Grand Lyon
 19/20 Rhône-Alpes
 19/20 Saint-Étienne
 12/13 Rhône-Alpes
 Soir 3 Rhône-Alpes
 19/20 Édition Touraine Val de Loire
 C'est mieux le matin
 Côté Jardin
 Chroniques d'en haut
 Declik
 Midi Pile du 12/13
 Lézard, culturel
 La voix est libre
 3 Partout
 Goûtez voir
 Le mag

See also
 France 3
 France 3 Alpes

References

External links 
 Official site 

03 Rhone-Alpes
Television channels and stations established in 1954
Mass media in Lyon